Boys' triathlon was part of the triathlon at the 2010 Summer Youth Olympics programme. The event consisted of  swimming,  cycling, and  running. It was held on 16 August 2010 at East Coast Park. The park is Singapore's most popular public beach and park; it is the venue of the Osim Singapore Triathlon, an Olympic triathlon event which began in 2002. Competitors swam in the open seas of the Singapore Strait and raced on the park's  track.

Aaron Barclay of New Zealand finished the race in first place. He was among the first few athletes to complete the first leg of the race and led a pack of nine riders in the second leg. Barclay ran neck and neck with Kevin McDowell of the United States before reaching the finish line. The event was Barclay's first triathlon outside Oceania, and his gold medal was New Zealand's first medal in the Youth Olympics. McDowell, who was a favourite to win the race after winning the American qualifying event, finished in second place. Alois Knabl of Austria finished third to win the bronze medal. Knabl was one of several athletes from his country who had the highest chances of winning a medal. Zimbabwe's Boyd Littleford and Bermuda's Ryan Gunn, who were in the final two places after the swimming segment, teamed up to complete the race together. Littleford had difficulties swimming when his goggles broke while underwater. Singapore's Scott Ang finished the race in 29th place.

Medalists

Results 
The race began at approximately 9:00 a.m. (UTC+8) on 16 August at East Coast Park.

Note: No one is allotted the number 13.

References

External links 

Triathlon at the 2010 Summer Youth Olympics